Hajjah may refer to:

 Hajjah, a city in Yemen
 Hajjah Governorate in Yemen
 Hajjah, Qalqilya, a Palestinian village in the West Bank
 Hajja, a Moroccan settlement
 Hajjah, a term used for a female pilgrim who has performed the Islamic pilgrimage of the Hajj

See also
 Hajji (disambiguation)